Salah Bin Muhammad Al Budair (born Hofuf, 1970) is a current Imam of the Grand Masjid in Madinah and a Judge of the High Court of Madinah. He was a former Imam of Masjid al-Haram, in Makkah.

References

1970 births
Living people
Saudi Arabian Quran reciters
Saudi Arabian Islamic religious leaders
Sunni imams
Saudi Arabian Sunni Muslim scholars of Islam
Saudi Arabian imams
Saudi Arabian Muslims
Muslim scholars of Islamic jurisprudence
Sharia judges
Imam Muhammad ibn Saud Islamic University alumni
20th-century imams
21st-century imams